William Hale (18091874) was a Michigan politician and attorney.

Early life
Hale was born in 1809 in Oneida County, New York.

Career
In 1836, Hale moved to Detroit, Michigan, where he was admitted to the bar that same year. Hale was first elected as a member of the Michigan Senate from the 1st district on November 4, 1844. He served in this position from January 6, 1845 to 1846. Hale then served as a prosecuting attorney from 1846 to 1849. Hale was the Michigan Attorney General from 1851 to 1854. In 1856, Hale was a delegate to Democratic National Convention from Michigan.

Personal life
Hale was married to Susan. Together they had four children.

Death
Hale moved to San Francisco, California in 1862. He died in California in 1874.

References

1809 births
1874 deaths
Michigan Attorneys General
Democratic Party Michigan state senators
19th-century American politicians
19th-century American lawyers